Toronto North was a federal electoral district represented in the House of Commons of Canada from 1904 to 1925. It was located in the city of Toronto in the province of Ontario. This riding was created in 1903 from parts of Toronto Centre, West Toronto and York East ridings.

It consisted of the part of the city of Toronto between Palmerston and Spadina Avenues in the west, and Sherbourne Street in the east and north of College and Carleton Streets, plus the part of the city east of Sherbourne and north of Bloor Street.  In 1914, it was redefined to consist of the part of the city of Toronto east of Oakwood and Dovercourt Roads and north of Bloor Street.

The electoral district was abolished in 1924 when it was redistributed between Toronto Northeast and Toronto Northwest and York West ridings.

Members of Parliament

Electoral history

|- 
  
|Conservative
|FOSTER, George E.
|align="right"| 4,422 
  
|Liberal
|URQUHART, Thomas 
|align="right"|4,310    
|}

|-
  
|Conservative
|FOSTER, Hon. George Eulas
|align="right"| 4,398
  
|Liberal
|SHAW, William Henry 
|align="right"|4,009    
|}

|-
  
|Conservative
|FOSTER, Hon. George Eulas
|align="right"| 6,474 
  
|Liberal
| SHAW, William Henry 
|align="right"| 3,157    
|}

|-
  
|Conservative
|FOSTER, Hon. G.E.
|align="right"| acclaimed   
|}

|-
  
|Government
|FOSTER, Rt. Hon. Sir George
|align="right"|21,130 

|Opposition-Labour
|YOUNG, Alfred James
|align="right"| 2,893 
|}

|-
  
|Conservative
|CHURCH, Thomas Langton
|align="right"|12,412 
  
|Liberal
|RENNIE, Robert  
|align="right"| 8,452   
|}

See also 

 List of Canadian federal electoral districts
 Past Canadian electoral districts

External links 

 Website of the Parliament of Canada

Former federal electoral districts of Ontario
Federal electoral districts of Toronto